Brachypnoea tristis is a species of leaf beetle. It is found in North America.

References

Further reading

 

Eumolpinae
Articles created by Qbugbot
Beetles described in 1808
Taxa named by Guillaume-Antoine Olivier
Beetles of North America